Nguyễn Phong Hồng Duy (born 13 June 1996) is a Vietnamese professional footballer who plays as a left winger and left-back for V.League 1 club Nam Định and the Vietnam national team.

International career

International goals

U-19

Honours
Vietnam 
AFF Championship: 2018

References 

1996 births
Living people
Vietnamese footballers
Association football wingers
Association football fullbacks
V.League 1 players
Hoang Anh Gia Lai FC players
People from Bình Phước Province
Vietnam international footballers
Southeast Asian Games medalists in football
Southeast Asian Games bronze medalists for Vietnam
2019 AFC Asian Cup players
Competitors at the 2015 Southeast Asian Games
Competitors at the 2017 Southeast Asian Games